Savannah is a 2013 American historical family  drama film directed, produced and written by Annette Haywood-Carter. It is based on the true story and the book Ward Allen: Savannah River Market Hunter by John Eugene Cay Jr. It stars Jim Caviezel, Jaimie Alexander, Chiwetel Ejiofor, Jack McBrayer and Sam Shepard. It was released by Ketchup Entertainment on August 23, 2013 in the US.

Plot
Narrated by a 95-year-old Christmas Moultrie (Ejiofor) as he recalls his friendship long ago with Ward Allen (Caviezel) in Savannah back in the early 20th century. Ward was born into privilege in the mid-1800s but settled for a life of duck hunting, which found him in front of Judge Harden (Holbrook) often. He was also found quite drunk, a point of tension with his wife, Lucy (Alexander) who married him to spite her father (Shepard) who wanted her to marry Sir Graham (McBrayer). Their marriage is later tested by his hard-drinking ways, his devotion to his hunting, and her breakdown after a stillbirth.

Cast
 Jim Caviezel as Ward Allen
 Chiwetel Ejiofor as Christmas Moultrie, a former slave, becomes fast friends with Ward
 Jaimie Alexander as Lucy Stubbs
 Jack McBrayer as Sir Graham, wealthy man Mr. Stubbs set Lucy up to marry
 Sam Shepard as Mr. Stubbs, Lucy's overbearing father
 Bradley Whitford as Jack Cay
 Hal Holbrook as Judge Harden
 Tracey Walter as Mathias
 Simone Griffeth as Mrs. Stubbs, Lucy's mother
 Stratton Leopold as John Elliot Ward

Production
Annette Haywood-Carter signed on as the director and also helped produce the film, along with Randall Miller and Jody Savin. With the film based on the book Ward Allen: Savannah River Market Hunter, Haywood-Carter co-wrote the screenplay with Kenneth Carter. Gil Talmi signed on to do the music for the film while Mike Ozier was in charge of cinematography and John David Allen with editing. Ketchup Entertainment released the film with Unclaimed Freight Productions production in association with Meddin Studios.

Filming started in early 2011 and took 21 days to shoot. The film was shot at various Savannah locations.

See also
 List of films featuring slavery

References

External links
 
 

2013 films
2013 drama films
American drama films
Films set in Savannah, Georgia
Films shot in Savannah, Georgia
Films set in the 20th century
2010s English-language films
2010s American films